Sia Kamanor (born 9 March 1977) is a Sierra Leonean sprinter. She competed in the women's 4 × 100 metres relay at the 1996 Summer Olympics.

References

1977 births
Living people
Athletes (track and field) at the 1996 Summer Olympics
Sierra Leonean female sprinters
Olympic athletes of Sierra Leone
Place of birth missing (living people)
Olympic female sprinters